Randall Keith Joseph Boyd (January 23, 1962 – January 19, 2022) was a Canadian professional ice hockey defenceman who played 257 games in the National Hockey League (NHL). He played for the Pittsburgh Penguins, Chicago Black Hawks, New York Islanders, and Vancouver Canucks between 1981 and 1988.

Boyd was born in Coniston, Ontario, on January 23, 1962. He was a resident of Marietta, Georgia, and died on January 19, 2022, four days shy of his 60th birthday.

Career statistics

Regular season and playoffs

References

External links
 

1962 births
2022 deaths
Baltimore Skipjacks players
Canadian ice hockey defencemen
Chicago Blackhawks players
Chicago Cheetahs players
Ice hockey people from Ontario
Milwaukee Admirals (IHL) players
New York Islanders players
Ottawa 67's players
Pittsburgh Penguins draft picks
Pittsburgh Penguins players
Sportspeople from Greater Sudbury
Springfield Indians players
Vancouver Canucks players
Wichita Thunder players
Wiener EV players